Tomura Dam  is a gravity dam located in Hokkaido Prefecture in Japan. The dam is used for power production. The catchment area of the dam is 329.9 km2. The dam impounds about 37  ha of land when full and can store 2900 thousand cubic meters of water. The construction of the dam was started on 1975 and completed in 1978.

References

Dams in Hokkaido